Tharwat Alhajaj is an Olympic weightlifting champion from Jordan. She represented Jordan in the 2016 Summer Paralympics held in Rio de Janeiro and won a Powerlifting silver. The 43-year-old lifted 119 kg in the women's 86 kg category to take silver behind Egypt's Randa Mahmoud who lifted 130 kg for gold. Bronze went to Mexico's Catalina Diaz Vilchis who managed 117 kg.

Tharwat also participated in the Asian Paralympics in 2014 and won a powerlifting silver in the women's 77 kg category, where she lifted 108 kg.

Results
https://olympics.com/tokyo-2020/paralympic-games/en/results/powerlifting/athlete-profile-n1358534-alhajaj-tharwh-tayseer-hamdan.htm

Powerlifting at the 2020 Summer Paralympics – Women's 86 kg

Powerlifting at the 2016 Summer Paralympics – Women's 86 kg

POWERLIFTING

Rank	Event	Year	Location	Result

Paralympic Games

2	–86 kg	2016	Rio de Janeiro, BRA	119

World Championships

5	–79 kg	2014	Dubai, UAE	114.0

6	–86 kg	2019	Nur-Sultan, KAZ	127.0

6	–86 kg	2017	Mexico City, MEX	117.0

9	–75 kg	2010	Kuala Lumpur, MAS	92.5

ATHLETICS

Rank	Event	Year	Location	Result

Paralympic Games

8	Women's Discus Throw F42-46	2004	Athens, GRE	21.40

13	Women's Discus Throw F57/58	2008	Beijing, CHN	23.05

World Championships

9	Women's Discus Throw F42/44	2006	Assen, NED	20.36

See also
 Jordan at the 2016 Summer Paralympics
 Jordan at the 2016 Summer Olympics

References

Medalists at the 2016 Summer Paralympics
Paralympic weightlifters
Jordanian sportswomen
Living people
Year of birth missing (living people)
Paralympic medalists in powerlifting
Paralympic silver medalists for Jordan
Powerlifters at the 2016 Summer Paralympics
Paralympic powerlifters of Jordan